In military terms, 156th Division or 156th Infantry Division may refer to:

 156th Division (Imperial Japanese Army)
 156th Division (People's Republic of China)
 156th Infantry Division (Wehrmacht)
 156th Infantry Division Vicenza (Italian, World War II)